The nitrogen-vacancy center (N-V center or NV center) is one of numerous point defects in diamond. Its most explored and useful property is its photoluminescence, which allows observers to read out its spin-state. The NV center's electron spin, localized at atomic scales, can be manipulated at room temperature by external factors such as magnetic, or electric fields, microwave radiation, or optical light, resulting in sharp resonances in the intensity of the photoluminescence. These resonances can be explained in terms of electron spin related phenomena such as quantum entanglement, spin–orbit interaction and Rabi oscillations, and analysed using advanced quantum optics theory. An individual NV center can be used as a basic unit for a quantum computer, a qubit, and used for quantum cryptography. Further potential applications in novel fields of electronics and sensing include spintronics, masers, and quantum sensors. If the charge is not specified the term "NV center" refers to the negatively charged NV− center.

Structure

The nitrogen-vacancy center is a point defect in the diamond lattice. It consists of a nearest-neighbor pair of a nitrogen atom, which substitutes for a carbon atom, and a lattice vacancy.

Two charge states of this defect, neutral NV0 and negative NV−, are known from spectroscopic studies using optical absorption, photoluminescence (PL), electron paramagnetic resonance (EPR) and optically detected magnetic resonance (ODMR), which can be viewed as a hybrid of PL and EPR; most details of the structure originate from EPR. The nitrogen atom on one hand has five valence electrons. Three of them are covalently bonded to the carbon atoms, while the other two remain non-bonded and are called a lone pair. The vacancy on the other hand has three unpaired electrons. Two of them form a quasi covalent bond and one remains unpaired. The overall symmetry, however, is axial (trigonal C3V); one can visualize this by imagining the three unpaired vacancy electrons continuously exchanging their roles.

The NV0 thus has one unpaired electron and is paramagnetic. However, despite extensive efforts, electron paramagnetic resonance signals from NV0 avoided detection for decades until 2008. Optical excitation is required to bring the NV0 defect into the EPR-detectable excited state; the signals from the ground state are presumably too broad for EPR detection.

The NV0 centers can be converted into NV− by changing the Fermi level position. This can be achieved by applying external voltage to a p-n junction made from doped diamond, e.g., in a Schottky diode.

In the negative charge state NV−, an extra electron is located at the vacancy site forming a spin S=1 pair with one of the vacancy electrons. As in NV0, the vacancy electrons are "exchanging roles" preserving the overall trigonal symmetry. This NV− state is what is commonly, and somewhat incorrectly, called "the nitrogen-vacancy center". The neutral state is not generally used for quantum technology.

The NV centers are randomly oriented within a diamond crystal. Ion implantation techniques can enable their artificial creation in predetermined positions.

Production

Nitrogen-vacancy centers are typically produced from single substitutional nitrogen centers (called C or P1 centers in diamond literature) by irradiation followed by annealing at temperatures above 700 °C. A wide range of high-energy particles is suitable for such irradiation, including electrons, protons, neutrons, ions, and gamma photons. Irradiation produces lattice vacancies, which are a part of NV centers. Those vacancies are immobile at room temperature, and annealing is required to move them. Single substitutional nitrogen produces strain in the diamond lattice; it therefore efficiently captures moving vacancies, producing the NV centers.

During chemical vapor deposition of diamond, a small fraction of single substitutional nitrogen impurity (typically <0.5%) traps vacancies generated as a result of the plasma synthesis. Such nitrogen-vacancy centers are preferentially aligned to the growth direction.

Diamond is notorious for having a relatively large lattice strain. Strain splits and shifts optical transitions from individual centers resulting in broad lines in the ensembles of centers. Special care is taken to produce extremely sharp NV lines (line width ~10 MHz) required for most experiments: high-quality, pure natural or better synthetic diamonds (type IIa) are selected. Many of them already have sufficient concentrations of grown-in NV centers and are suitable for applications. If not, they are irradiated by high-energy particles and annealed. Selection of a certain irradiation dose allows tuning the concentration of produced NV centers such that individual NV centers are separated by micrometre-large distances. Then, individual NV centers can be studied with standard optical microscopes or, better, near-field scanning optical microscopes having sub-micrometre resolution.

Energy level structure 
The NV center has a ground-state triplet (3A), an excited-state triplet (3E) and two intermediate-state singlets (1A and 1E). Both 3A and 3E contain ms = ±1 spin states, in which the two electron spins are aligned (either up, such that ms = +1 or down, such that ms = -1), and an ms = 0 spin state where the electron spins are antiparallel. Due to the magnetic interaction, the energy of the ms = ±1 states is higher than that of the ms = 0 state. 1A and 1E only contain a spin state singlet each with ms = 0.

If an external magnetic field is applied along the defect axis (the axis which aligns with the nitrogen atom and the vacancy) of the NV center, it does not affect the ms = 0 states, but it splits the ms = ±1 levels (Zeeman effect). Similarly the following other properties of the environment influence the energy level diagram :

 Amplitude and orientation of a static magnetic field splits the ms = ±1 levels in the ground and excited states.
 Amplitude and orientation of elastic (strain) or electric fields have a much smaller but also more complex effects on the different levels.
 Continuous-wave microwave radiation (applied in resonance with the transition between ms = 0 and (one of the) ms = ±1 states) changes the population of the sublevels within the ground and excited state.
 A tunable laser can selectively excite certain sublevels of the ground and excited states.
 Surrounding spins and spin–orbit interaction will modulate the magnetic field experienced by the NV center.
 Temperature and pressure affect different parts of the spectrum including the shift between ground and excited states.

The above-described energy structure is by no means exceptional for a defect in diamond or other semiconductor.  It was not this structure alone, but a combination of several favorable factors (previous knowledge, easy production, biocompatibility, simple initialisation, use at room temperature etc.) which suggested the use of the NV center as a qubit and quantum sensor.

Optical properties 

NV centers emit bright red light (3E→3A transitions), if excited off-resonantly by visible green light (3A →3E transitions). This can be done with convenient light sources such as argon or krypton lasers, frequency doubled Nd:YAG lasers, dye lasers, or He-Ne lasers. Excitation can also be achieved at energies below that of zero phonon emission.

As the relaxation time  from the excited state is small (~10 ns), the emission happens almost instantly after the excitation. At room temperature the NV center's optical spectrum exhibits no sharp peaks due to thermal broadening. However, cooling the NV centers with liquid nitrogen or liquid helium dramatically narrows the lines down to a width of a few MHz. At low temperature it also becomes possible to specifically address the zero-phonon line (ZPL).

An important property of the luminescence from individual NV centers is its high temporal stability. Whereas many single-molecular emitters bleach (i.e. change their charge state and become dark) after emission of 106–108 photons, bleaching is unlikely for NV centers at room temperature. Strong laser illumination, however, may also convert some NV− into NV0 centers.

Because of these properties, the ideal technique to address the NV centers is confocal microscopy, both at room temperature and at low temperature.

State manipulation

Optical spin manipulation 
Optical transitions must preserve the total spin and occur only between levels of the same total spin. Specifically, transitions between the ground and excited states (with equal spin) can be induced using a green laser with a wavelength of 546 nm. Transitions 3E→1A and 1E→3A are non-radiative, while 1A →1E has both a non-radiative and infrared decay path.

The diagram on the right shows the multi-electronic states of the NV center labeled according to their symmetry (E or A) and their spin state (3 for a triplet (S=1) and 1 for a singlet (S=0)). There are two triplet states and two intermediate singlet states.

Spin-state initialisation 
An important property of the non-radiative transition between 3E and 1A is that it is stronger for ms = ±1 and weaker for ms = 0. This provides the basis a very useful manipulation strategy, which is called spin state initialisation (or optical spin-polarization). To understand the process, first consider an off-resonance excitation which has a higher frequency (typically 2.32 eV (532 nm)) than the frequencies of all transitions and thus lies in the vibronic bands for all transitions. By using a pulse of this wavelength, one can excite all spin states from 3A to 3E. An NV center in the ground state with ms = 0 will be excited to the corresponding excited state with ms = 0 due to the conservation of spin. Afterwards it decays back to its original state. For a ground state with ms = ±1, the situation is different. After the excitation, it has a relatively high probability to decay into the intermediate state 1A by non-radiative transition and further into the ground state with ms = 0. After many cycles, the state of the NV center (independently of whether it started in ms = 0 or ms = ±1) will end up in the ms = 0 ground state. This process can be used to initialize the quantum state of a qubit for quantum information processing or quantum sensing.

Sometimes the polarisability of the NV center is explained by the claim that the transition from 1E to the ground state with ms = ±1 is small, compared to the transition to ms = 0. However, it has been shown that the comparatively low decay probability for ms = 0 states w.r.t. ms = ±1 states into 1A  is enough to explain the polarization.

Effects of external fields

Microwave spin manipulation 
The energy difference between the ms = 0 and ms = ±1 states corresponds to the microwave regime. Population can be transferred between the states by applying a resonant magnetic field perpendicular to the defect axis. Numerous dynamic effects (spin echo, Rabi oscillations, etc.) can be exploited by applying a carefully designed sequence of microwave pulses. Such protocols are rather important for the practical realization of quantum computers. By manipulating the population, it is possible to out the NV center into a more sensitive or stable state. Its own resulting fluctuating fields may also be used to influence the surrounding nuclei or protect the NV center itself from noise. This is typically done using a wire loop (microwave antenna) which creates an oscillating magnetic field.

Influence of external factors 
If a magnetic field is oriented along the defect axis it leads to Zeeman splitting separating the ms = +1 from the ms = -1 states. This technique is used to lift the degeneracy and use only two of the spin states (usually the ground states with ms = -1 and ms = 0) as a qubit. Population can then be transferred between them using a microwave field. In the specific instance that the magnetic field reaches 1027 G (or 508 G) then the ms = –1 and ms = 0 states in the ground (or excited) state become equal in energy (Ground/Excited State Level Anticrossing). The following strong interaction results in so-called spin polarization, which strongly affects the intensity of optical absorption and luminescence transitions involving those states.

Importantly, this splitting can be modulated by applying an external electric field, in a similar fashion to the magnetic field mechanism outlined above, though the physics of the splitting is somewhat more complex. Nevertheless, an important practical outcome is that the intensity and position of the luminescence lines is modulated. Strain has a similar effect on the NV center as electric fields.

There is an additional splitting of the ms = ±1 energy levels, which originates from the hyperfine interaction between surrounding nuclear spins and the NV center. These nuclear spins create magnetic and electric fields of their own leading to further distortions of the NV spectrum (see nuclear Zeeman and quadrupole interaction). Also the NV center's own spin–orbit interaction and orbital degeneracy leads to additional level splitting in the excited 3E state.

Temperature and pressure directly influence the zero-field term of the NV center leading to a shift between the ground and excited state levels.

The Hamiltonian, a quantum mechanical equation describing the dynamics of a system, which shows the influence of different factors on the NV center can be found below.

Although it can be challenging, all of these effects are measurable, making the NV center a perfect candidate for a quantum sensor.

Charge state manipulation 
It is also possible to switch the charge state of the NV center (i.e. between NV−,  NV+ and  NV0) by applying a gate voltage.

Potential applications

The spectral shape and intensity of the optical signals from the NV− centers are sensitive to external perturbation, such as temperature, strain, electric and magnetic field. However, the use of spectral shape for sensing those perturbation is impractical, as the diamond would have to be cooled to cryogenic temperatures to sharpen the NV− signals. A more realistic approach is to use luminescence intensity (rather than lineshape), which exhibits a sharp resonance when a microwave frequency is applied to diamond that matches the splitting of the ground-state levels. The resulting optically detected magnetic resonance signals are sharp even at room temperature, and can be used in miniature sensors. Such sensors can detect magnetic fields of a few nanotesla or electric fields of about 10 V/cm at kilohertz frequencies after 100 seconds of averaging. This sensitivity allows detecting a magnetic or electric field produced by a single electron located tens of nanometers away from an NV− center.

Using the same mechanism, the NV− centers were employed in scanning thermal microscopy to measure high-resolution spatial maps of temperature and thermal conductivity (see image).

Another possible use of the NV− centers is as a detector to measure the full mechanical stress tensor in the bulk of the crystal. For this application, the stress-induced splitting of the zero-phonon-line is exploited, and its polarization properties. A robust frequency-modulated radio receiver using the electron-spin-dependent photoluminescence that operated up to 350 °C demonstrates the possibility for use in extreme conditions.

In addition to the quantum optical applications, luminescence from the NV− centers can be applied for imaging biological processes, such as fluid flow in living cells. This application relies on good compatibility of diamond nano-particles with the living cells and on favorable properties of photoluminescence from the NV− centers (strong intensity, easy excitation and detection, temporal stability, etc.). Compared with large single-crystal diamonds, nanodiamonds are cheap (about 1 USD per gram) and available from various suppliers. NV− centers are produced in diamond powders with sub-micrometre particle size using the standard process of irradiation and annealing described above. Due to the relatively small size of nanodiamond, NV centers can be produced by irradiating nanodiamond of 100 nm or less with medium energy H+ beam. This method reduces the required ion dose and reaction, making it possible to mass produce fluorescent nanodiamonds in ordinary laboratory.  Fluorescent nanodiamond produced with such method is bright and photostable, making it excellent for long-term, three dimensional tracking of single particle in living cell. Those nanodiamonds are introduced in a cell, and their luminescence is monitored using a standard fluorescence microscope.

Further NV− center has been hypothesized to be a potential bio-mimetic system for emulating radical pair spin dynamics of the avian compass.

Stimulated emission from the NV− center has been demonstrated, though it could be achieved only from the phonon side-band (i.e. broadband light) and not from the ZPL. For this purpose, the center has to be excited at a wavelength longer than ~650 nm, as higher-energy excitation ionizes the center.

The first continuous-wave room-temperature maser has been demonstrated. It used 532-nm pumped NV− centers held within a high Purcell factor microwave cavity and an external magnetic field of 4300 G. Continuous maser oscillation generated a coherent signal at ~9.2 GHz.

The NV center can have a very long spin coherence time approaching the second regime. This is advantageous for applications in quantum sensing and quantum communication. Disadvantageous for these applications is the long radiative lifetime (~12 ns
) of the NV center and the strong phonon sideband in its emission spectrum. Both issues can be addressed by putting the NV center in an optical cavity.

Historical remarks
The microscopic model and most optical properties of ensembles of the NV− centers have been firmly established in the 1970s based on the optical measurements combined with uniaxial stress and on the electron paramagnetic resonance. However, a minor error in EPR results (it was assumed that illumination is required to observe NV− EPR signals) resulted in the incorrect multiplicity assignments in the energy level structure. In 1991 it was shown that EPR can be observed without illumination, which established the energy level scheme shown above. The magnetic splitting in the excited state has been measured only recently.

The characterization of single NV− centers has become a very competitive field nowadays, with many dozens of papers published in the most prestigious scientific journals. One of the first results was reported back in 1997. In that paper, it was demonstrated that the fluorescence of single NV− centers can be detected by room-temperature fluorescence microscopy and that the defect shows perfect photostability. Also one of the outstanding properties of the NV center was demonstrated, namely room-temperature optically detected magnetic resonance.

See also
Crystallographic defects in diamond
Crystallographic defect
Material properties of diamond

Notes

References

Diamond
Spintronics
Spectroscopy
Crystallographic defects
Quantum computing